Natalia may refer to:

People 
 Natalia (given name), list of people with this name 

 Natalia (Belgian singer) (born 1980)
 Natalia (Greek singer) (born 1983)
 Natalia (Spanish singer) (born 1982)

Music and film 
 Natalia (film), a 1988 French film
 "Natalia", a 1981 song by Van Morrison
 "Natalia", a Venezuelan Waltz by Antonio Lauro

Places 
 Natalia Republic, a former republic in South Africa
 Natalia, Greater Poland Voivodeship (west-central Poland)
 Natalia, Masovian Voivodeship (east-central Poland)
 Natalia, Texas, a city in Medina County, Texas, United States

Ships 
, a United States Navy patrol boat in commission from 1917 to 1918